The Women's keirin event of the 2015 UCI Track Cycling World Championships was held on 22 February 2015.

Results

First round
The first round was started at 11:40.

Heat 1

Heat 2

Heat 3

Heat 4

First round repechage
The first round repechage was started at 12:15.

Heat 1

Heat 2

Heat 3

Heat 4

Second round
The second round was started at 14:55.

Heat 1

Heat 2

Finals
The finals were started at 15:20.

Small final

Final

References

Women's keirin
UCI Track Cycling World Championships – Women's keirin